Grant David Raphael is an English freelance television cameraman who came to fame on July 24, 2008 when the High Court in London ordered him to pay a total of GBP £22,000 (roughly US $44,000 at July 2008 exchange rates) for libel and breach of privacy.  The court decided that Raphael had posted a fake page on the social networking website Facebook purporting to be that of a former schoolfriend and business colleague, Mathew Firsht, with whom he had fallen out in 2000.  The phoney Firsht profile had been signed up to gay groups and it was falsely suggested that Firsht was untrustworthy and that his business owed money.

The case is remarkable and newsworthy because it is believed to be the first time that somebody has been successfully sued for libel over the content of a page on a social networking website.

References 

Living people
English defamation case law
Year of birth missing (living people)